Felis chaus fulvidina is a jungle cat subspecies.
The mammal collector of the Natural History Museum Oldfield Thomas described the first jungle cat from Indochina in 1928.

It occurs mainly in deciduous forests rich in dipterocarp trees.
Since the early 1990s, jungle cats have been rarely encountered in Thailand, and have suffered drastic declines due to hunting and habitat destruction. Today, their official status in the country is critically endangered. In Cambodia, Laos and Vietnam, jungle cats have been subject to extensive hunting. Skins are occasionally recorded in border markets, and live individuals, possibly taken from Myanmar or Cambodia, occasionally turn up in the Khao Khieo and Chiang Mai zoos of Thailand.

References

fulvidina
Taxa named by Oldfield Thomas